Goofy Gymnastics is a Goofy cartoon produced by Walt Disney Productions and released by RKO Radio Pictures on September 23, 1949.

Plot
Goofy enters home tired after a hard day at work. Exhausted, he suddenly notices an exercise advertisement in his newspaper. He orders gymnastics equipment and with the aid of an instruction record he tries out using the barbells, the chin-up bars and cable expanders, all of which meet with disastrous results. Goofy destroys the floors of his apartment in the process and flies out of the window before he is swung back against the muscular chart of his equipment. While he stands behind the cardboard muscular man he is glad that he finally resembles a muscular man.

Legacy
"Goofy Gymnastics" is one of Goofy's most popular and famous cartoons. The cartoon is also shown in Who Framed Roger Rabbit (1988)  during the scene where Roger and Eddie hide in a cinema. Roger Rabbit laughs out loud with the cartoon, praises Goofy's timing and finesse and claims he is a "genius." However, this is an anachronism, since "Who Framed Roger Rabbit" takes place in the year 1947, while Goofy Gymnastics was released in 1949. This cartoon was also shown in September 2002 as part of the "Salute to Sports" episode of Disney's House of Mouse.

Voice cast
 Goofy: Pinto Colvig
 Off-screen man: Billy Bletcher
 Narrator: John McLeish

Home media
The short was released on December 2, 2002, on Walt Disney Treasures: The Complete Goofy and on the "Walt Disney's Classic Cartoon Favorites Extreme Sports Fun" Volume 5.

References

More information
Disney Shorts Information

1949 films
1949 animated films
1940s Disney animated short films
1940s sports films
Goofy (Disney) short films
Gymnastics films
Films directed by Jack Kinney
Films produced by Walt Disney
Films scored by Oliver Wallace